The Netherlands was represented by Justine Pelmelay, with the song "Blijf zoals je bent", at the 1989 Eurovision Song Contest, which took place in Lausanne, Switzerland on 13 May. Pelmelay was the winner of the Dutch national final for the contest, held on 10 March.

Before Eurovision

Nationaal Songfestival 1989 
The final was held at the RAI Congrescentrum in Amsterdam, hosted by Linda de Mol. Thirteen songs took part with the winner being decided by juries in the twelve Dutch provinces, who awarded points from 13 down to 1. Pelmelay emerged a comfortable winner by a margin of 21 points.

At Eurovision 
On the night of the final Pelmelay performed 4th in the running order, following Ireland and preceding Turkey. After a strong performance, Pelmelay's voice famously cracked on the final long note of the song, a fact she acknowledged with a wry facial expression as the song ended. At the close of voting "Blijf zoals je bent" had received 45 points from ten countries, placing the Netherlands 15th of the 22 entries. The Dutch jury awarded its 12 points to Denmark.

The Dutch conductor at the contest was Harry van Hoof.

Voting

References

External links 
 Dutch Preselection 1989

1989
Countries in the Eurovision Song Contest 1989
Eurovision